The 2003 Imo State gubernatorial election occurred in Nigeria on April 19, 2003. The PDP nominee Achike Udenwa won the election, defeating Ezekiel Izogu of the APGA.

Achike Udenwa emerged PDP candidate. He picked Ebere Udeagu as his running mate. Ezekiel Izogu was the APGA candidate with J. A. Iroegbu as his running mate.

Electoral system
The Governor of Imo State is elected using the plurality voting system.

Primary election

PDP primary
The PDP primary election was won by Achike Udenwa. He picked Ebere Udeagu as his running mate.

APGA primary
The APGA primary election was won by Ezekiel Izogu. He picked J. A. Iroegbu as his running mate.

Results
A total number of 11 candidates registered with the Independent National Electoral Commission to contest in the election.

The total number of registered voters in the state was 1,630,494.

References 

Imo State gubernatorial elections
Imo State gubernatorial election
Imo State gubernatorial election
Imo State gubernatorial election